Bujar is an Albanian masculine given name which means generous. People named Bujar include:

Bujar Asqeriu (born 1956), Albanian actor
Bujar Dida (born 1961), Albanian chemist and diplomat
Bujar Bukoshi (born 1947), Kosovar politician 
Bujar Lako (1947–2016), Albanian actor
Bujar Lika (born 1992), Swiss-Albanian footballer 
Bujar Nishani (born 1966), Albanian politician, the sixth President of Albania
Bujar Osmani (born 1979), Albanian politician from Macedonia
Bujar Shabani (born 1990), Kosovar footballer
   

Albanian masculine given names